Primitive Origins is an EP by American heavy metal band Prong. It features songs like "In My Veins" which was later re-recorded during a session with John Peel (BBC) and released on The Peel Sessions. All songs were written by Tommy Victor and Michael Kirkland.

Track listing 
"Disbelief" – 1:42
"Watching" – 1:52
"Cling to Life" – 1:39
"Denial" – 1:42
"Dreams Like That" – 2:19
"In My Veins" – 2:09
"Climate Control" – 3:13
"Persecution" – 4:56

Personnel 
Tommy Victor – vocals, guitar
Ted Parsons – drums
Mike Kirkland – bass

References 

Prong (band) albums
1987 debut EPs
Albums produced by Tommy Victor